Not to be mistaken for Stephen Caffrey, an Irish footballer.

Stephen Edwin Caffrey (born September 27, 1959, Cleveland, Ohio) is an American television, film and stage actor. He is the fifth of seven children born to an Irish-American family in Cleveland. 

At the age of 17, he and his family permanently settled in Grand Rapids, MI. Steven pursued an acting career after graduation and with a close knit group of acting friends, he founded the Immediate Theatre in Chicago.

Career

Film & television 
He has appeared on such TV series as Tour of Duty, CSI: Miami, Touched by an Angel, Judging Amy, Providence, Profiler, The Practice, Seinfeld, Chicago Hope, Murder, She Wrote, Columbo, Diagnosis Murder.

His longest stints, for which he is best known, are as Lt. Myron Goldman on CBS's Vietnam War drama series, Tour of Duty, co-starring with Terence Knox, Kim Delaney, Tony Becker, and  Miguel A. Núñez Jr.  He also starred as Andrew Preston Cortlandt on ABC's All My Children.

He appeared in such films as the AIDS drama Longtime Companion (1990), The Babe (1992; starring John Goodman), Murder of Innocence (1993), Buried Alive II (1997; starring Ally Sheedy) and Blowback (2000; with Mario Van Peebles). Also appeared as a cadet in the 1984 movie Hard Knox, starring Robert Conrad and Red West.

Theatre
Caffrey has performed regularly at the American Conservatory Theater in San Francisco, California. In 1997, he performed in Leslie Ayvazian's Singer's Boy, directed by Carey Perloff. In 2003, Caffrey replaced Canadian actor, Geordie Johnson, as Torvald Helmer in a production of A Doll's House due to visa issues as a result of the War on terror. In 2004, he was in a production of The Real Thing. In 2005, he was Anthony Voysey in David Mamet's adaptation of The Voysey Inheritance''.

Filmography

References

External links
 
 
 
 Biodata
 Biodata

1959 births
Living people
American male film actors
American male soap opera actors
American male stage actors
American male television actors
American people of Irish descent
Male actors from Ohio
Male actors from Chicago
Male actors from Cleveland
Male actors from San Francisco